Erebia kefersteini is a  butterfly found in the East  Palearctic (Altai, Sayan, Tuva, North Mongolia.) that belongs to the browns family.

Description from Seitz

kefersteini. Er. (36 b) is nearest to melampus and of the same size. The central area inclusive of  the cell is brown-red, the base and the costal, distal and hindmargins being black-brown. In the male the reddish yellow distal band, which is divided into 6 spots by the veins, contrasts in colour but slightly with the central area and proximally gradually  disappears in the latter. There are small black pupils in spots 2, 3 and 4 counted from the costal side. The underside is lighter, more greyish brown, the markings being as above. Among the few specimens examined there is one which essentially differs in markings: The forewing is black-brown, being centrally but little dusted with brown; the black dots are completely absent from the band of both wings. In the female  the forewing is dark brown , the cell being more or less filled in with red-brown. There are 4 — 5 black ocelli in the spots of the transverse band, and the hindwing bears 4 red-brown ovate spots with black dots.

See also
List of butterflies of Russia

References

Satyrinae